Borj-e Mirgol (also Romanized as Borj-e Mīrgol; also known as Borj-e Mīr Ghūl) is a village in Qorqori Rural District, Qorqori District, Hirmand County, Sistan and Baluchestan Province, Iran. At the 2006 census, its population was 278, in 55 families.

References 

Populated places in Hirmand County